Reginald I (also called "the One-eyed", Reinald I, Renaud I;  – 10 March 1149) was Count of Bar (1105–1149). Barrois, during the Middle Ages, was the territory of the counts and dukes of Bar, in the eastern part of present-day France, bordering Lorraine.

He was the son of Theodoric I, Count of Montbéliard and Ermentrude of Bourgogne, the daughter of William I, Count of Burgundy.

Reginald's first wife is unknown.  He later married Gisele de Vaudémont, widow of Rainard III, Count of Toul, and daughter of Gérard I, Count of Vaudémont, and his wife Heilwig von Egisheim.  Reginald and Gisele had eight children:
 Hugh de Bar (d. 29 September 1141)
 Reginald II, Count of Bar
 Drogo de Bar
 Dietrich III de Bar (d. 8 August 1171), Bishop of Metz
 Agnes de Bar (d. after 1185), married Albert. Count of Chiny
 Clemence de Bar (1123–1183), married first Alberic II, Count of Dammartin, second Renaud, Count of Clermont, and third Thibaut III de Crépy
 Mathilde de Bar, married Konrad I, Count of Wildgraf von Kyrburg
 Stephaine de Bar (d. 1178), married Hugh III, Seigneur of Broyes and Châteauvillain
Reginald was one of the leaders of the Second Crusade in 1145. He was drowned somewhere in the Mediterranean Sea on his return voyage to Europe on or before 10 March 1149.

Reginald I of Bar succeeded Theodoric II of Bar (r. 1092–1105) who was succeeded in turn by Reginald II of Bar (r. 1150–1170) in 1150.

Sources
 Ancestral Roots of Certain American Colonists Who Came to America Before 1700 by Frederick Lewis Weis, Line 144–24.
Medieval Lands Project on Renaud (Reginald) de Bar

House of Montbelliard
Renaut I
Counts of Verdun
Lords of Mousson
Renaut I
1080s births
1149 deaths